{{Infobox television
| image          = MTV Nishedh.jpg
| caption        =
| genre          = 
| screenplay     = 
| director       = Victor Mukherjee
| writer         = 
| num_seasons    = 2
| num_episodes   = 17
| based_on       = {{based on|MTV Shuga}}
| starring       = See below
| theme_music_composer     = Chirrantan Bhatt
| opentheme      = "Khul Ke Bol"
| endtheme       = 
| composer       = 
| country        = India
| language       = Hindi
| producer       = Chris Wilson
| cinematography = Hanoz Kerawala
| camera         = Multi-camera
| runtime        = 23 minutes
| distributor    = Viacom 18
| channel        = MTV India
| picture_format = 720p 1080i (HDTV)
| company        = Victor Tango Entertainment Pvt. Ltd.
| first_aired    = 
| last_aired     = present
}}MTV Nishedh'' is an Indian television series that aired on MTV India from 25 January 2020. Nishedh is a remake of the African TV series Shuga. The show's core lies in highlighting the importance of dealing with taboos. A second season premiered on 19 November 2022.

Cast

Season 1
 Malhaar Rathod as Astha 
 Rajat Verma as Gaurav
 Priya Chauhan as Megha
 Deependra Kumawat as Pankaj
 Chitransh Raj as Mehul
 Ashish Bhatia as Dr. Agarwal
 Sachin Vidrohi as Ajay
 Aanchal Goswami as Prerna
 Asheema Vardaan as Inaaya
 Madhvendra Jha as Papa ji
 Himika Bose as Laxmi
 Diksha Juneja as Jyoti
 Gautam Vig as Raghav
 Ashwin Mushran as Kumar Sukumar
 Shivam Patil as Manav
 Purvesh Pimple as Rohit
 Syed Raza as Vicky
 Akshay Nalawade as Bunty
 Anubha Arora as Riddhi
 Riya Jha as Guddi

Season 2
 Asheema Vardaan as Inaaya
 Aaryan Tandon as Pankaj
 Anusubdha Bhagat as Hina
 Rrama Sharma as Sushmita
 Sachin Vidrohi as Ajay
 Aanchal Goswami as Prerna
 Chitransh Raj as Mehul

Series overview

Production

Development
The series was announced in January 2020, consisting of thirteen episodes premiered on MTV India on 25 January 2020.

The second season was announced in November 2022, consisting of ten episodes premiered on MTV India on 19 November 2020.

Episodes

Season 1

Season 2

Soundtrack 

MTV Nishedh soundtrack is composed by Chirrantan Bhatt. The title song is  "Khul Ke Bol" sung by Neeti Mohan.

See also 
List of programmes broadcast by MTV (India)

References

External links
 
 
 MTV Nishedh on Voot

MTV (Indian TV channel) original programming